Religious education in Kerala was historically influenced by traditional Indian religions like Hinduism, Buddhism and Jainism through Gurukula, an ancient education system, with Abrahamic religions becoming practiced in Kerala at early stages through ancient maritime trade. Buddhism added educational vocabulary, including Namostu Jinatam, Ezhuthu Palli and Pallikoodam to education in the Malayalam language. Madrasa institutions, coordinated by various Madarasa education boards, referred to as Othupalli or Palli Dar, since the independence of India. Modern Christian education began in the early 19th century.

Hindu religious education  

According to Sudha Nambudiri, Thanthra Vidyapeedam, a low profile Vedic and tantric pathshala, or a Vedic and ritual school, at Aluva founded by Kalpuzha Divakaran Namboodiripad and P Madhavji in 1972 gives education in Kerala's temple shastra, Kerala's form of temple rituals, which follows Adi Shankara traditions in the Gurukulam system. Nambudiri says Vidyapeedam admits only ten tenth standard passed boys with some academic knowledge of the Sanskrit language, selected on the basis of their individual horoscopes every year. The seven year curriculum includes theoretical and practical studies in temple rituals based on Tantra Samuchayam, authored by Chennas Narayanan Nampoothiri, the Vedas, the Sanskrit language, Vaastu Shastra, Jyothisha, Yoga and meditation. On the completion of the course, which helps students join as temple priests or Sanskrit language teachers, students are awarded a postgraduate level degree, known as Thanthraratna, in the Sanskrit language by Ujjain's Maharishi Sandipani Rashtriya Ved Vidya Pratishthan.

Buddhist religious education  

Buddhism has historical influences on educational culture in Kerala.  Origin of calling schools such as Ezhuthu Palli and Pallikoodam are under the influence of Buddhism. Until the end of the 18th century, the word 'Namostu Jinatam' (Namotu Chinatam) was used in the beginning of education training in Kerala in praise of the Buddha, meaning a prayer to Jinan or Buddha. At that time, the entire text of Kerala was called Nanam Manam. It is an abbreviation of the Pali verses Naanam, Monam, Ettanam, Thuvanam, Jeenam, Ennanam, Thanam and Ummanam, corresponding to the eight noble ways: the right perspective, the right goal, the right speech, the right action, the right way of life, the right focus, the right concentration, and the right effort.

Christian religious education 

In 1815, a British Resident, Colonel John Munro, founded a seminary in Kottayam, for the theological education of Jacobite Christian priests and invited the Anglican missionaries to teach there. This could be regarded as the beginning of the relationship between the Church Mission Society and the Saint Thomas Christians of the Puthenkuttukar, or "New Allegiance". Restrictions were imposed on Saint Thomas Christian parishes in order to start new schools, and later on the Travancore Diwan after they attempted to take over the schools owned by the community. The St. Joseph's LP School at Koonammavu was the first Catholic school for girls, and the first convent in Kerala was established in 1868 in simple a bamboo-mat house by Mother Eliswa, who later established more girls schools.

Islamic religious education 
According to K. Mohammed Basheer, Kerala, a southern state of India, has one of the oldest madrasa (Malayalam: othupalli / Palli Dar) education systems in India which has been reformed in modern times to include non–religious subjects along with religious subjects.  Muslim communities, specifically Mappilas in Kerala form one of the high literacy communities amongst Muslims in India. Historically, madrasas used to impart primary oral religious education, were connected to a mosque, and imams in the mosque used to work as religious teachers as well. Madrasas were non-residential whilst residential facilities supported by mosques and the Muslim village community were called Palli Dar. During the British colonisation of India, madrasas were upgraded to centres of primary education. Post-independence, madrasas hold religious education classes before or after regular schools. The All Kerala Islamic Education Board were the first organisation to conduct centralised examinations, subsequently different schools of Islamic thoughts came forward to form their own Islamic education boards to train teachers and conduct centralized examinations; namely the Samastha Kerala Islam Matha Vidyabhyasa Board (SKIMVB), the Dakshiana Kerala Islam Matha Vidyabhyasa Board ( DKIMVB), the Samastha Kerala Sunni Vidyabhyasa Board (SKSVB) and the Samastha Kerala Islamic Education Board (SKIEB) are grounded in Ahl as-Sunnah, the Kerala Nadvathul Mujahideen Vidyabhyasa Board (KNM) and The Council for Islamic Education and Research (CIER) are rooted in the Ahal I Hadith school whereas the Majlis al Ta'alim al Islami kerala (Majlis) represents Jama'at i Islami.

As the Kerala Government does not have its own centralising Madrasa board, Kerala madrasas affiliate themselves to various madrasa boards backed by various religious institutions, based on different ideologies. Among the Madarasa boards, Samastha Kerala Islam Matha Vidyabhyasa Board (SKIMVB), is the largest board, with 80 percent of madrasa affiliating with it in Kerala.

Since the 20th century, Arabic language classes have been popularized in Kerala for advanced religious education.

Islamic universities operate in Kerala, including Al Jamia Islamia and Darul Huda Islamic University.

Samastha Kerala Sunni Vidyabhyasa Board 
The SKSVB has affiliation of around ten thousand madrasas that account to around one million students and fifty thousand teachers, mainly from Kerala, however some come from across India and a few from overseas, being affiliated to SKSVB. The SKSVB is headquartered at Kozhikode, Kerala along with regional offices at Delhi, Mumbai, Kolkata, Bengal and Bangalore.

See also 

 Education in Kerala
 Religion in Kerala
 Kerala Yukthivadi Sangham
 Dinkoism
 Basel Evangelical Mission Parsi High School, Thalassery
 :Category:Christian schools in Kerala

Bibliography 

 Sexuality, Abjection and Queer Existence in Contemporary India. India, Taylor & Francis, 2021.
 Dr A Antony, Teacher and Education in Indian Society. N.p., Notion Press, 2016. 
 
 Mohammed, U.. Educational Empowerment of Kerala Muslims: A Socio-historical Perspective. India, Indian Council of Historical Research, 2007. P.P. 69 
 Sikand, Yoginder. Bastions of the Believers: Madrasas and Islamic Education in India. India, Penguin Books India, 2005. P.P. 129 
 A Study of the Christian Colleges in Kerala: Report of the Commission for Christian Colleges, 1980–81. India, Kerala Educational Research Centre, 1982.

References 

Institutes of higher Islamic learning in Kerala
Madrasas in India
Islamic education in India